Alden is a village in Erie County, New York, United States. The population was 2,605 at the 2010 census. It is part of the Buffalo–Niagara Falls Metropolitan Statistical Area.

The village is centrally located within the town of Alden. Its principal street is Broadway (U.S. Route 20).

History 

Alden was incorporated in 1869. In 1996, residents of the village voted against dissolving to merge with the town.

Geography
According to the United States Census Bureau, the village has a total area of 2.7 square miles (7.0 km), all  land.

US Route 20 (Broadway) intersects the northern terminus of former NY-239, now Erie County Route 578 (Exchange Street), in Alden village.

Demographics

At the 2000 census there were 2,666 people, 1,083 households, and 723 families living in the village. The population density was 980.2 people per square mile (378.4/km). There were 1,144 housing units at an average density of 420.6 per square mile (162.4/km).  The racial makeup of the village was 98.72% White, 0.34% Black or African American, 0.08% Native American, 0.56% Asian, 0.11% Pacific Islander, and 0.19% from two or more races. Hispanic or Latino of any race were 0.19%.

Of the 1,083 households 32.9% had children under the age of 18 living with them, 53.2% were married couples living together, 9.7% had a female householder with no husband present, and 33.2% were non-families. 28.3% of households were one person and 12.6% were one person aged 65 or older. The average household size was 2.45 and the average family size was 3.01.

The age distribution was 26.3% under the age of 18, 6.6% from 18 to 24, 30.8% from 25 to 44, 21.1% from 45 to 64, and 15.3% 65 or older. The median age was 38 years. For every 100 females, there were 98.4 males. For every 100 females age 18 and over, there were 93.2 males.

The median household income was $41,630 and the median family income  was $51,161. Males had a median income of $34,821 versus $24,245 for females. The per capita income for the village was $20,864. About 4.9% of families and 7.6% of the population were below the poverty line, including 9.8% of those under age 18 and 6.5% of those age 65 or over.

Notable people
 Lyman K. Bass, born in Alden, United States congressman
 Mike Cole, former New York state assemblyman
 Edmund F. Cooke, US congressman
 Charles H. Larkin, Wisconsin pioneer politician
 Doreen Taylor, country singer

References

Villages in New York (state)
Buffalo–Niagara Falls metropolitan area
Villages in Erie County, New York